Queen's Golden Jubilee Medal may refer to:

 Queen Victoria Golden Jubilee Medal (1887)
 Queen Elizabeth II Golden Jubilee Medal (2002)